Kundiman is a nonprofit organization dedicated to nurturing generations of writers and readers of Asian American literature. The organization offers an annual writing retreat, readings, workshops, a mentorship program, and a poetry prize, and aims to provide "a safe yet rigorous space where Asian American poets can explore, through art, the unique challenges that face the new and ever changing diaspora." Kundiman was co-founded in 2004 by Asian American poets Sarah Gambito and Joseph O. Legaspi, and has received support from the National Endowment for the Arts, the New York City Department of Cultural Affairs, the Poetry Foundation, the New York Community Trust, Philippine American Writers, PAWA, and individuals.

Kundiman and Fordham University have formed an affiliation in which Kundiman will "enhance the outreach of Fordham’s English Department," and Fordham hosts the annual Kundiman Poetry Retreat on Fordham's Rose Hill campus beginning in 2010, and host Kundiman-sponsored readings and events at the Lincoln Center Campus. Fordham also provided a total of $60,000 over three years in financial support for Kundiman's programs.

The organization’s name refers to a style of Filipino love song that served as veiled patriotism during colonial times. Kundiman Fellows have published in The Virginia Quarterly Review,The Colorado Review, Pleiades, Black Warrior Review and Crab Orchard Review." There have been over 302 books published by Kundiman fellows.

Honors given by Kundiman include The Kundiman Poetry Prize, for a book by an Asian American poet at any stage in their career. The winning manuscript is published by Tupelo Press, and according to Kundiman, "is the only poetry prize dedicated to Asian American poets
in the country."

In light of "systemic bias" within the Wikipedia community, Kundiman hosts Wikipedia Edit-A-Thons in order to address the lack of visibility of Asian American writers and accuracy about their work. Kyle Lucia Wu, the programs and communications manager at Kundiman, said the idea of creating a Wikipedia Edit-A-Thon came to her when she saw that there were, at the time, only 240 names listed on Wikipedia's page for Asian American writers.

Kundiman Retreat 
The Kundiman Retreat was started in 2004 by Sarah Gambito and Joseph O. Legaspi. The inaugural Retreat was hosted at the University of Virginia in 2004. It now takes place at Fordham University. Poet Duy Doan said of the Kundiman Retreat: "I would never be able to overemphasize the positive impact that the Kundiman retreats have had on me—writing, musing, connecting with other Asian–Pacific Islander American writers, being taken in by a richly talented and generous community." Poet Chen Chen said that the Kundiman Retreat was "really magical and opened up my eyes to what was possible in the Asian American literary community." 

The Kundiman Retreat has received support from the National Endowment of the Arts. Starting in 2015, the retreat was opened up to fiction writers as well as poets. 

Kundiman fellows include:

Kundiman Faculty includes:

See also
 CantoMundo
 Cave Canem Foundation

References

External links
 Kundiman Website
 Video: 2005 Kundiman Retreat Readings

2004 establishments in New York City
American poetry
American writers' organizations
Arts organizations based in New York City
Arts organizations established in 2004
Asian-American literature
Asian-American organizations
Culture of New York City
Non-profit organizations based in New York (state)
Poetry organizations